The 1971 Cardiff City Council election was held on Thursday 13 May 1971 to elect councillors to Cardiff City Council in Cardiff, Glamorgan, Wales. It took place on the same day as several other county borough elections in Wales and England.

The previous elections to this one were in May 1970 and the next elections would be in May 1972. The 1971 election would be the penultimate all-Cardiff election before the dissolution of the unitary authority and the creation of the new second-tier district authority of Cardiff City Council in 1974.  

The election saw the Labour Party taking a significant number of seats back from the Conservatives.

Background
Cardiff County Borough Council had been created in 1889. Cardiff became a city in 1905. Elections to the local authority were held annually, though not all council seats were included in each contest, because each of the three councillors in each ward stood down for election in rotation. The councillors elected in 1971 would serve for less than three years, before the dissolution of the present Council in April 1974.

The local government elections took place in the context of Edward Heath's new Conservative UK government (which had been elected only 11 months previously) and rising prices and unemployment.

Overview of the result

Nineteen seats in 19 electoral wards were up for election in May 1971. In what was described as a "night of disaster for the Conservatives" the Labour Party more than recovered the position they had been in Cardiff prior to the 1967 elections. Labour gained a total of 11 seats, including one in the previous Tory stronghold of Whitchurch. A number of former Cardiff Labour councillors won their seats back, including Eva Davies, Emyr Currie-Jones, Philip Dunleavy, Harold Bartlett and Dengar Evans.

Council composition
Following the May 1970 election the balance on the city council was 57 Conservatives, 18 Labour and one Plaid Cymru. With 11 out of 19 seats changing hands in May 1971, Cardiff Labour chairman Cllr Jack Brooks called for the other two thirds of Cardiff seats to be put up for election, saying it was unfair that the Conservatives should remain in control.

Ward results
Contests took place in every ward at this election.

Adamsdown

Canton

Cathays

Central

Ely

Gabalfa

Grangetown

Llanishen

Llandaff

Penylan

Plasmawr

Plasnewydd

Rhiwbina

Riverside

Roath

Rumney

South

Splott

Whitchurch

* = 'retiring' ward councillor for re-election

See also
 1973 Cardiff City Council election

References

Cardiff
Council elections in Cardiff
1970s in Cardiff